The Ruskin School of Art, known as the Ruskin, is an art school at the University of Oxford, England. It is part of Oxford's Humanities Division.

History
The Ruskin grew out the Oxford School of Art, which was founded in 1865 and later became Oxford Brookes University. It was headed by Alexander Macdonald and housed in the University Galleries (subsequently the Ashmolean Museum of Art and Archaeology).

In 1869 John Ruskin was appointed Slade Professor of Fine Art at Oxford. Critical of the teaching methods at the Oxford School of Art, he set out to found the Ruskin School of Drawing in 1871 in the same, but restructured, premises. Macdonald was also retained as its head and became, therefore, the first Ruskin Master until his death in 1921.

It was renamed to Ruskin School of Drawing and Fine Art in 1945, and to Ruskin School of Art in 2014. The Ruskin remained at the Ashmolean until 1975 when it moved to 74 High Street. An annexe at 128 Bullingdon Road was redeveloped in 2015, and the Ruskin now operates across both sites. The Slade School of Fine Art relocated to the Ruskin for the duration of the Second World War.

Education
The school was originally founded to encourage artisanship and technical skills. It now provides undergraduate and postgraduate qualifications in the production and study of visual art. The subject is taught as a living element of contemporary culture with a broad range of historical and theoretical references.

Ruskin Masters
The school was traditionally headed by an appointed Ruskin Master. From 2002 to 2010, Richard Wentworth was the last to hold this position which, since then, remained vacant.

Since 2017, the current Head of School is Professor Anthony Gardner.

Previous Ruskin Masters were:
Stephen Farthing 1990–2000
David Tindle 1985–1987
Philip Morsberger 1971–1984
Richard Naish 1964–1971
Percy Horton 1949–1964
Albert Rutherston 1929–1949
Sydney Carline 1922–1929
Alexander Macdonald 1871–1922

Alumni

References

Further reading
 Robert Hewison, John Ruskin: the Argument of the Eye, Princeton University Press 1976, Chapter Seven: Action (online version at Victorian Web)

External links
 Ruskin School of Art
 University of Oxford Admissions

Educational institutions established in 1871
1871 establishments in England
Departments of the University of Oxford
Art schools in England
John Ruskin